The 1911 Liverpool general transport strike, also known as the great transport workers' strike, involved dockers, railway workers, sailors and other tradesmen. The strike paralysed Liverpool commerce for most of the summer of 1911. It also transformed trade unionism on Merseyside. For the first time, general trade unions were able to establish themselves on a permanent footing and become genuine mass organisations of the working class.

Strike action began on 14 June when the National Sailors' and Firemen's Union announced a nationwide merchant seamen's strike. Solidarity action in support of the seamen led to other sections of workers coming out on strike. A strike committee, chaired by the syndicalist Tom Mann, was formed to represent all of the workers in dispute.

Many meetings were held on St. George's Plateau, next to St. George’s Hall, on Lime Street, including the rally on 13 August in which police carried out a baton charge a crowd of 85,000 people, who had gathered to hear Tom Mann speak. The event became known as "Bloody Sunday".

In the police charges and subsequent unrest that carried on through the following night, over 350 people were injured. 3,500 British troops had become stationed in the city. Two days later, soldiers of the 18th Hussars opened fire on a crowd on Vauxhall Road, injuring fifteen, two fatally: John Sutcliffe, a 19-year-old Catholic carter, was shot twice in the head, and Michael Prendergast, a 30-year-old Catholic docker, was shot twice in the chest. An inquest into their deaths later brought in a verdict of "justifiable homicide".

Home Secretary Winston Churchill sent in troops and positioned the cruiser  in the Mersey.

See also 

 Great Unrest

References

Further reading
Taplin, E.L. Near to Revolution: The Liverpool General Transport Strike of 1911'' Bluecoat press, 1994

External links
Libertarian Communist perspective on strike
Full calendar of 1911 Liverpool in issue 17 of Nerve magazine

Liverpool General Transport Strike, 1911
Liverpool General Transport Strike
General strikes in the United Kingdom
Labour disputes in England
History of Liverpool
Industrial history of England
Politics of Liverpool
1910s in Liverpool
Transport strikes